Xinghua Subdistrict is a subdistrict of Tiexi District, Shenyang, People's Republic of China. , it has six residential communities under its administration.

See also
List of township-level divisions of Liaoning

References

Township-level divisions of Liaoning